St Paul's Church is a former church building located in Perth, Perth and Kinross, Scotland. Standing in St Paul's Square, on the Old High Street, at its junction with South Methven Street, it was completed in 1807. The work of architect John Paterson, it is now a Category B listed building. It was one of the first churches to be built in Perth after the Reformation, sparked by John Knox's sermon at the nearby St John's Kirk in 1559.

The church closed in 1986, and fell into a state of dereliction.

In June 2021, the church's bell rang out for the first time in thirty years, completing a £2.2-million restoration of the church into an outdoor performance space.

St Paul's Square
The square in which the church stands is also part of the Category B listing.

Perth band Fiction Factory frequented Bandwagon Music Supplies, which was located behind the church in St Paul's Square. "They would come into my shop wanting to hear their recording on my wee cassette recorder that turned out to be a number six single that still gets played today," said Pete Caban, the shop's owner. "I still see the guys, they still come in." The shop closed in 2020 after 37 years in business, with Caban blaming the delayed work on the church and resultant drop in foot traffic to the square.

The building of the former Bandwagon Music shop now houses a gallery and gift shop.

See also

List of listed buildings in Perth, Scotland

References 

Category B listed buildings in Perth and Kinross
Listed churches in Scotland
Paul's, Saint
1807 establishments in Scotland
Listed buildings in Perth, Scotland